Donald W. Smith (born December 7, 1990) is an American retired soccer player who previously played as a left back for the New England Revolution of MLS and the Charlotte Independence of the USL Championship.

Career

Charlotte 49ers

As a four-year player at Charlotte, Smith scored 18 goals with 10 assists in 82 appearances (45 starts) for the 49ers. From 2010 to 2012, Smith was named to the Atlantic-10 All-Conference team and in 2012 was named the Conference Midfielder of the Year. In 2011, Smith helped propel Charlotte to a runner-up finish in the NCAA Division I Men's Soccer Championship. He was named to the College Cup All-Tournament team after playing a key role in the 49ers run to the College Cup Championship game.

New England Revolution
Smith was selected as the first pick in the 2nd round of the 2013 MLS SuperDraft and 21st pick overall by the New England Revolution on January 17, 2013. On March 9, 2013, Smith officially made his Major League Soccer debut for the Revolution in their match against the Chicago Fire.
Re-signed with the Revs on January 13, 2014.

Charlotte Independence
Smith signed with USL side Charlotte Independence on January 15, 2018.
He retired from professional soccer shortly after the conclusion of the 2018 season.

Career statistics

Club
Statistics accurate as of March 9, 2013

References

External links 
 

1990 births
Living people
American soccer players
Charlotte 49ers men's soccer players
North Carolina Fusion U23 players
New England Revolution players
Rochester New York FC players
Charlotte Independence players
Association football defenders
Soccer players from Charlotte, North Carolina
New England Revolution draft picks
USL League Two players
Major League Soccer players
USL Championship players